Fleurus Island is an island lying  south of Delaite Island in Wilhelmina Bay, off the west coast of Graham Land, Antarctica. it was shown on an Argentine government chart of 1950, and was named by the UK Antarctic Place-Names Committee in 1956 after the British ship Fleurus, which visited the area in 1928.

See also 
 List of Antarctic and sub-Antarctic islands

References 

Islands of Graham Land
Danco Coast